APEP Pelendriou (Athlitiki Podosfairiki Enosi Pelendriou; "Athletic Football Union Pelendriou") is a Cypriot football club based in Pelendri. Founded in 1956, was playing sometimes in Second and sometimes in the Third and Fourth Division.

Honours
 Cypriot Third Division:
 Champions (1): 1990
 Cypriot Fourth Division:
 Champions (1): 1988–89

References

Football clubs in Cyprus
Association football clubs established in 1956
1956 establishments in Cyprus